Philobota partitella is a moth of the family Oecophoridae. It is found in Australia.

Its wingspan is around 20 mm.

References

Oecophoridae
Moths of Australia
Moths described in 1864